Sleepyhead(s) or Sleepy Head may refer to:

Film and television
 "Sleepyhead" (Thorne), a story arc in the 2010 UK TV series Thorne
 Sleepy Head, a 1920 film featuring Dagmar Dahlgren
 Sleepyhead, a kind of Munchkin in the film The Wizard of Oz

Music 
 Sleepyhead (band), a 1990s American rock band
 Sleepy-Head, a 1915 piano composition by Arnold Bax

Albums
 Sleepyhead (album), Sibille Attar album, 2013
 Sleepyheads, a 2003 album by Mr. Lif
 Sleepyhead, a 2002 album by The Brothers Creeggan
 Sleepyhead, a 2020 album by Cavetown
 Sleepyhead, a 2003 EP by Blueline Medic
 Sleepyhead, a 2016 EP by Galen Crew

Songs
 "Sleepyhead" (song), a song by Passion Pit
 "Sleepyhead", a song by 78 Saab from The Bells Line
 "Sleepyhead", a song by Alkaline Trio from Maybe I'll Catch Fire
 "Sleepyhead", a song by As Tall as Lions from You Can't Take It with You
 "Sleepy Head", a song by Beat Happening from You Turn Me On
 "Sleepyheads", a song by the Black Crowes from Soul Singing
 "Sleepyhead", a song by Bomb the Bass from Clear
 "Sleepyhead", a song by Deconstruction from Deconstruction
 "Sleepy Head", a song by D:Ream from In Memory Of...
 "Sleepyhead", a song by Fun Lovin' Criminals, a B-side of the single "Korean Bodega"
 "Sleepyhead", a song by Gob from The World According to Gob
 "Sleepyhead", a song by Greta from No Biting
 "Sleepyhead", a song by Ed Harcourt from Elephant's Graveyard
 "Sleepy Head", a song by Ben E. King from I Have Songs in My Pocket
 "Sleepyhead", a song by Earl Klugh from The Spice of Life
 "Sleepy Head (Serene Machine)", a song by Ed Kuepper from Serene Machine
 "Sleepy Head", a song by the Pillows, music for the anime series FLCL
 "Sleepyhead", a song by The Reason from Things Couldn't Be Better
 "Sleepyheads", a song by XTC from Coat of Many Cupboards
 "Sleepy Head", a song composed by Billy Hill
 "Sleepy Head (Elin's Lullaby)", a composition by Richard Kearns

Other uses
 Sleepyhead, a 1953 Royal Doulton Figurine
 Sleepyhead, a 2001 novel by Mark Billingham and basis for the Thorne episodes

See also 
 National Sleepy Head Day, an annual celebration in Finland